The Quds News Network (QNN, see Quds) is a Palestinian news agency. It is associated with Hamas, and is popular among young Palestinian Internet users for showing videos of the Palestinian conflict and encouraging them to wage war on the Israeli government.

Its website is blocked by the Palestinian Authority at the West Bank because it was critical of the administration of President Mahmoud Abbas, and for its ties with his rival Hamas. In the same week, the block led to protests in the Gaza Strip, accusing Fatah of censorship.

Twitter suspended its accounts in 2019. On 26 January, 2021, QNN tweeted from a backup account, that their original Twitter accounts were restored.

References

External links 
  
  

News agencies based in Palestine
Palestinian news websites